Bereah was a town in Polk County, Florida. Remains include the cemetery of the Corinth Primitive Baptist Church.

References

Ghost towns in Florida
Former populated places in Polk County, Florida